Cipro (formerly Cipro–Musei Vaticani) is an underground station on Line A of the Rome Metro, inaugurated in 1999. The station is situated between Via Cipro and Via Angelo Emo.

Cipro is the Italian name for Cyprus, which the street that the station is on is named after. Several streets in the area are named after places and people related to the history of the Republic of Venice and other Repubbliche Marinare.

Archaeology
In the open-air atrium below street level, some archeological finds, found in 1993/94 during the digging of the Ottaviano-Battistini section of Line A, are exhibited. They include a 3rd-century CE sarcophagus in Carrara marble, a funerary ash urn, and some inscriptions; in the neighbourhood, which in ancient times was out of Rome proper, there was a large burial ground, on both sides of Via Triumphalis.

In 1991, the municipality of Rome planned to call the station Mosca (Moscow). To reciprocate, a Moscow Metro station was named Rimskaya (Roman).

Services
This station has:
 Access for the disabled
 277 Park and Ride spaces
 Elevators
 Escalators
 Bus terminus

Located Nearby
 Musei Vaticani
 Piazzale degli Eroi
 Mercato Trionfale
 Ospedale Oftalmico

References

External links

Cipro station on the Rome public transport site 

Rome Metro Line A stations
Railway stations opened in 1999
1999 establishments in Italy
Rome Q. XIV Trionfale
Railway stations in Italy opened in the 20th century